Mir Naimatullah Zehri is a Pakistani politician who is member-elect of the Provincial Assembly of Balochistan.

Political career
He was elected to the Senate of Pakistan as a candidate of Pakistan Muslim League (N) in 2015 Pakistani Senate election.

He was elected to the Provincial Assembly of Balochistan as an independent candidate from Constituency PB-36 (Shaheed Sikandarabad) in 2018 Pakistani general election. Following his successful election, he joined Pakistan Tehreek-e-Insaf (PTI). He resigned as a senator on 12 August 2018 to continue as a member of the provincial assembly.

References

Living people
Pakistani senators (14th Parliament)
Year of birth missing (living people)